Thomas Dudley (died 1593) was an English politician.

He was a Member (MP) of the Parliament of England for Coventry in 1563, Wallingford in 1571, Warwick in 1572, 1584, 1586 and 1589, and Newtown, Isle of Wight in 1593.

References

Year of birth missing
1593 deaths
English MPs 1563–1567
English MPs 1571
English MPs 1572–1583
English MPs 1584–1585
English MPs 1586–1587
English MPs 1589
English MPs 1593
Members of Parliament for Coventry